Gary Price (born 9 March 1961) is an English former professional rugby league footballer who played in the 1970s, 1980s and 1990s.

Background
Gary Price was born in Castleford, West Riding of Yorkshire, England.

Playing career

Featherstone Rovers
Price was signed by Featherstone Rovers in August 1989. He made his début for the club on 17 September 1989.

Price played , in Featherstone Rovers' 14–20 defeat by Bradford Northern in the 1989 Yorkshire Cup Final during the 1989–90 season at Headingley, Leeds on Sunday 5 November 1989, in front of a crowd of 12,607.

From 1993 onwards, he was usually referred to as "Gary S. Price", or by his nickname "Slugger", to avoid confusion with another second-rower signed by Rovers, who was also named Gary Price.

References

1961 births
Living people
English rugby league players
Featherstone Rovers players
Leeds Rhinos players
Rugby league players from Castleford
Rugby league second-rows
York Wasps players